This is a list of notable events in the history of LGBT rights that took place in the year 1976.

Events

January 
 1 — Iowa repeals its "sexual psychopath" law. Passed in the wake of a moral panic following the 1954 rape and murder of a young boy, the law had been used to detain dozens of gay men in mental institutions in the 1950s.

February 

 12 — The Pennsylvania Council for Sexual Minorities is formed by Governor Milton J. Shapp of Pennsylvania.
 29 —  New York City's public radio channel, WNET, airs a special titled "OUTREACH: LESBIANS AND GAY MEN".

May
City council of Los Angeles prohibits employment discrimination by the city based on sexual orientation.

July
 1 — U.S. state of Indiana decriminalizes private consensual adult homosexual acts.
19 — Homosexual activity becomes illegal, as does same-sex marriage, in Liberia.

September
 4 — Start of the three-day "Fourth Annual Gay Conference for Canada and Quebec," held in Toronto, including a rally and march.

November 

 4 — A law on decriminalizing male homosexual acts goes into effect in Australian Capital Territory

See also

Timeline of LGBT history — timeline of events from 12,000 BCE to present
LGBT rights by country or territory — current legal status around the world
LGBT social movements

Notes

References
 Miller, Neil (2002). Sex-crime Panic: A Journey to the Paranoid Heart of the 1950s. Los Angeles, Alyson Books. .

LGBT rights by year
1976 in LGBT history